FC Svetogorets was a football club from Svetogorsk, Leningrad Oblast, Russia. Its foundation date is unknown but the club is known to exist at least since 1978. Played in some Leningrad Oblast championships in the 1990s. In 2000 it played in North-West zone of the Russian amateur championship (KFK) and won the zonal tournament. In 2001–2003 it played in the Russian Second Division, zone West, and in the Russian Cup. In 2004 it withdrew from the Russian Second Division and disappeared. Among its players were Aleksandr Kerzhakov, Sergei Dmitriev, Andrei Manannikov; among staff – Vladimir Kazachyonok and Vladimir Klementyev. Its home arena was Central Stadium in Svetogorsk.

External links 
 Klisf.info club data

Football clubs in Russia
Defunct football clubs in Russia
Sport in Leningrad Oblast
2004 disestablishments in Russia